Francine Shapiro  (February 18, 1948 – June 16, 2019) was an American psychologist and educator who originated and developed eye movement desensitization and reprocessing (EMDR), a form of psychotherapy for resolving the symptoms of traumatic and other disturbing life experiences.

In 1987, she had an experience walking through a park that ignited the chance observation that moving her eyes from side to side appeared to reduce the disturbance of negative thoughts and memories.  This experience led her to examine this phenomenon more systematically.  Working with approximately 70 volunteers, she developed standardized procedures to maximize therapeutic outcomes, conducted additional research and published a randomized controlled study with trauma victims.  After further research and elaboration of the methodology, she published a textbook in 1995 detailing the eight phases of this form of psychotherapy.

Early life
Shapiro was born in Brooklyn, the daughter of Dan, who managed a garage and a fleet of taxis, and his wife, Shirley. The death of her younger sister Debra at the age of nine affected her deeply.

Education
Shapiro held a BA (1968) and MA (1974) in English Literature from Brooklyn College, City University of New York. In 1974, while employed full-time as a high school English teacher, she enrolled in a PhD program in English Literature at New York University. In 1979, having completed all but her dissertation, she was diagnosed with cancer. Shapiro travelled, then settled in San Diego and set up a nonprofit organization, Human Development Institute, along with Shirley Phares-Kime.

Her post-recovery experiences shifted her attention from literature to the effects of stress on the immune system, based on the work of Norman Cousins and others.

Over the next few years she participated in numerous workshops and programs exploring various stress reduction and self-care procedures. During that time, she enrolled in the Professional School of Psychological Studies, San Diego (which was not regionally accredited, but was approved by the state of California for psychologist licensure and is now defunct). Her observations regarding the beneficial effect of eye movements, and the development of procedures to utilize them in clinical practice, became the basis of her dissertation. She received her PhD in 1988, and her thesis was published in the Journal of Traumatic Studies in 1989,  followed by an invited article that was published in the Journal of Behavior Therapy and Experimental Psychiatry.

Affiliations, presentations, publications
Shapiro went on to devote herself to the development and research of EMDR therapy. She was a senior research fellow emeritus at the Mental Research Institute, Palo Alto, California, executive director of the EMDR Institute, Watsonville, California, and founder and president emeritus of EMDR Humanitarian Assistance Programs, a non-profit organization that coordinates disaster response and pro bono trainings worldwide.  The organization was a recipient of the 2011 International Society for Traumatic Stress Studies Sarah Haley Memorial Award for Clinical Excellence. Shapiro was designated as one of the “Cadre of Experts” of the American Psychological Association & Canadian Psychological Association Joint Initiative on Ethnopolitical Warfare, and served as advisor to a wide variety of trauma treatment and outreach organizations and journals. She was an invited speaker at psychology conferences and universities worldwide, and wrote and co-authored more than 60 journal articles, chapters, and books about EMDR, including the primary text Eye Movement Desensitization and Reprocessing:  Basic Principles, Protocols and Procedures.  She was a licensed clinical psychologist and resided in Northern California.

Awards
As the developer of EMDR, Shapiro was the recipient of a variety of awards, including the International Sigmund Freud Award for Psychotherapy of the City of Vienna in conjunction with the World Council for Psychotherapy, the American Psychological Association Trauma Psychology Division Award for Outstanding Contributions to Practice in Trauma Psychology, and the Distinguished Scientific Achievement in Psychology Award presented by the California Psychological Association.

Death
Shapiro received a second cancer diagnosis in her later years.

She died suddenly on June 16, 2019 at a medical center North of San Francisco not far from her home, after a long-term struggle with respiratory issues. The actual cause of death was unknown.

Publications

Books
 Shapiro, F (2001). Eye Movement Desensitization and Reprocessing: Basic Principles, Protocols, and Procedures. Guildford Press. 
 Shapiro, F (Ed.) (2002). EMDR as an Integrative Psychotherapy Approach: Experts of Diverse Orientations Explore the Paradigm Prism. APA. 
 Shapiro, F. (2012). Getting Past Your Past: Take Control of Your Life with Self-Help Techniques from EMDR Therapy.  New York: Rodale. 
 Shapiro, F & Forrest, M S (2004). EMDR: The Breakthrough Therapy for Overcoming Anxiety, Stress and Trauma. Basic books. 
 Shapiro, F., Kaslow, F., & Maxfield, L. (Eds.) (2007). Handbook of EMDR and Family Therapy Processes. Wiley. 
 Solomon, M.F.,  Neborsky,  R.J.,  McCullough,  L.,  Alpert,  M.,  Shapiro,  F., & Malan,  D. (2001). Short-Term Therapy for Long-Term Change.  New York: Norton. 
 Adler-Tapia, R., Settle, C., & Shapiro, F. (2012). Eye Movement Desensitization and Reprocessing (EMDR) psychotherapy with children who have experienced sexual abuse and trauma. In P. Goodyear-Brown & P. Goodyear-Brown (Ed) (Eds.), Handbook of child sexual abuse: Identification, assessment, and treatment.
 Shapiro, F. (2017) Eye Movement Desensitization and Reprocessing (EMDR) Therapy, Third Edition: Basic Principles, Protocols, and Procedures. The Guilford Press.

References

Sources
 Brown, S., & Shapiro, F. (2006). EMDR in the Treatment of Borderline Personality Disorder. Clinical Case Studies, 5(5), 403–420.

1948 births
2019 deaths
21st-century American Jews
21st-century American women
20th-century American psychologists
American women psychologists
Brooklyn College alumni

Jewish American academics
Jewish American scientists
Jewish American writers
New York University alumni
People from East New York, Brooklyn
Scientists from New York City